Attune Foods is a manufacturer of natural and organic cereals and probiotic snack bars that was purchased by Post Foods in 2013. The company was founded in 1908, with the introduction of Uncle Sam Cereal, which it still sells. Its other brands are Erewhon, New Morning, and Skinner's.

References 

Food manufacturers of the United States
Post Holdings